Melhus Sparebank is a Norwegian savings bank, headquartered in Melhus, Norway. The bank’s main market is
Sør-Trøndelag. The bank was established in 1840 and is one of Norway’s oldest savings banks.

References

Banks of Norway
Companies based in Trøndelag
Banks established in 1840
Companies listed on the Oslo Stock Exchange
Melhus